Jefferson Township is a township in Taylor County, Iowa, USA.

History
Jefferson Township was established in 1858. It is named for Thomas Jefferson, third President of the United States.

References

Townships in Taylor County, Iowa
Townships in Iowa
1858 establishments in Iowa
Populated places established in 1858